Evolution is an original novel written by John Peel and based on the long-running British science fiction television series Doctor Who. It features the Fourth Doctor and Sarah.

Plot
Sarah Jane wants to meet Rudyard Kipling, and so the Doctor materializes in Victorian England. However, there is trouble: Children have vanished, lights have been seen beneath the bay, with fishermen found mutilated, and graves have been robbed.

The Doctor and a whaler's doctor, Arthur Conan Doyle, join to expose a plot to mess with human evolution, while Sarah Jane and Kipling face horrors of their own.

External links

1994 British novels
1994 science fiction novels
Virgin Missing Adventures
Fourth Doctor novels
Novels by John Peel
Cultural depictions of Arthur Conan Doyle
Fiction set in 1880